Regina "Gina" Buggy (born November 12, 1959 in Plymouth Meeting, Pennsylvania) is a former field hockey player from the United States, who was a member of the Women's National Team that won the bronze medal at the 1984 Summer Olympics in Los Angeles, California.

References

External links
 

1959 births
Living people
American female field hockey players
Field hockey players at the 1984 Summer Olympics
Medalists at the 1984 Summer Olympics
Olympic bronze medalists for the United States in field hockey
21st-century American women
20th-century American women